Wesley Koolhof and Matwé Middelkoop were the defending champions but chose not to defend their title.

Sander Arends and Mateusz Kowalczyk won the title after defeating Marco Chiudinelli and Luca Vanni 6–7(2–7), 6–3, [10–5] in the final.

Seeds

Draw

References
 Main Draw

Brest Challenger - Doubles